The Second Matsukata Cabinet is the sixth Cabinet of Japan led by Matsukata Masayoshi from September 18, 1896, to January 12, 1898.

Cabinet

References 

Cabinet of Japan
1896 establishments in Japan
Cabinets established in 1896